Callidrepana saucia is a moth in the family Drepanidae first described by Felder in 1861. It is found on Peninsular Malaysia, in New Guinea (including the Bismarck Islands) and Indonesia (Moluccas, Sulawesi, Borneo, Sumatra).

Subspecies
Callidrepana saucia saucia (Moluccas, Sulawesi, New Guinea, Bismarck Islands)
Callidrepana saucia sundobscura Holloway, 1998 (Borneo, Sumatra, Peninsular Malaysia)

References

Moths described in 1861
Drepaninae
Moths of New Guinea
Moths of Malaysia
Moths of Indonesia